The Daphne Civic Center is a multipurpose convention and performing arts center located in Daphne, Alabama, United States (a suburb of Mobile). The Center features  of exhibit and meeting space in the main exhibit hall, which also features a 37-by-70-foot permanent stage. For concerts, the exhibit hall can seat 1,700; for banquets, 900; receptions, 1,247; and in a classroom setup, 676.

There are five meeting rooms totaling , plus a circular,  lobby.  The lobby is where the Civic Center's concession stands and restrooms are located.

History
First proposed in April 1996 at an estimated cost of $4.2 million, plans to borrow money to build the Daphne Civic Center were approved in May 1997 with a $4.5 million budget attached. Upon completion, the center ultimately cost $6 million to construct and equip.

Scheduled for completion in September 1999, the center opened to the public on December 2, 1999 for Christmas by the Bay, the Baldwin County Humane Society's annual holiday fund-raiser.

Events

The Daphne Civic Center hosts a variety of recurring and special events. It is the site of the annual Gulf Coast Zydeco Music Festival. In February 2008, the center drew media attention when it hosted a Mardi Gras ball then twelve hours later was ready to open as a voting center for Alabama's primary elections.

See also
List of convention centers in the United States

References

External links
Daphne Civic Center official website

Concert halls in the United States
Convention centers in Alabama
Buildings and structures in Baldwin County, Alabama
Event venues established in 1999
Tourist attractions in Baldwin County, Alabama
Music venues in Alabama
1999 establishments in Alabama